Debika Mitra is an indian Bengali film actress. She work in Bengali films.

Filmography

 Bhalobasa Antaheen (2013)
 Shatru (2011)
 Mahanagari (2010)
 Neel Akasher Chandni (2009)
 Byatikromi (2006)
 Sathihara (2006)
 Protarak (2002)
 Dadathakur (2001)
 Ebong Tumi Aar Ami (2001)
 Mastermasai (2001)
 Ostad (2001)
 Bhalobashar Chhoan (2000)
 Harjit (2000)
 Joy Maa Durga (2000)
 Mayna (2000)
 Shatruta (2000)
 Swashurbari Zindabad (2000)
 Tomay Pabo Bole (1999)
 Bidroho (1997)
 Matribhumi (1997)
 Lathi (1996)
 Mukhyamantri (1996)
 Amodini (1995)
 Phire Paoa (1993)
 Surer Bhubane (1992)
 Raja Badsha (1990)
 Ora Charjon (1988)
 Agniswar (1975)

References

External links
 
 Debika Mitra in Gomolo

Living people
Indian film actresses
Bengali actresses
Bengali Hindus
Indian Hindus
Year of birth missing (living people)